No Time for Romance is a 1948 musical directed by Corney Cook. The film was noted for having an all-Black cast and for being one of the few all-Black films to be filmed in color during the era.

Plot 
A struggling L.A. nightclub performer (Eunice Wilson) and bandleader (Austin McCoy) have a shot at success with their new song, "A Lovely Day."

Cast 

 Eunice Wilson as Cynda Drake 
 Bill Walker as J.T. Richards
 Austin McCoy as Ted Wayne 
 Shirley Haven as Marie Gerald 
 Joel Fluellen as Drums Miller
 Mildred Boyd as Barbara Gerald
 Jay Brooks as Lefty 
 DeForest Covan as Charlie Byron Ellis
 Byron Ellis and Louise Franklin as Byron and Beau Dance Team
 Ray Martin as Ringer Gordon

Production 
Shot in Burbank, California, for a budget of around $60,000, No Time for Romance was intended to be the first feature of six produced by Norwanda Pictures, a motion picture company owned and operated by Black filmmakers. However, it appears that the company folded shortly after making No Time for Romance, although the 1948 western Sun Tan Ranch—which features many of the same actors—appears to also have been a Norwanda Pictures production.

Release 
The film showed in a few Black theaters in Los Angeles but was mostly forgotten about until the producer's daughter discovered the film in the family attic in 1983. The film was released on VHS in 1991.

References 

1948 films
1940s musical films
Films set in Los Angeles
American musical films
1940s American films